Fouta may refer to:

 Fouta Djallon, a highland region in the centre of Guinea
 Fouta towel, a piece of thin patterned fabric used in many Mediterranean countries 
 Fouta Toro, a region along the border of Senegal and Mauritania

See also
 Futa (disambiguation)
 Foutanké (horse)